Never Back Losers is a 1961 British crime film directed by Robert Tronson and starring Jack Hedley, Jacqueline Ellis and Patrick Magee. The film is based on The Green Ribbon (1929) by Edgar Wallace. It was one of the Edgar Wallace Mysteries, British second-features, produced at Merton Park Studios in the 1960s.

Plot
Horse racing jockey Wally Sanders loses a race, crashes his car, and a claim is made on his insurance. Jim Matthews, a shrewd insurance investigator, follows up the company's suspicion of foul play and finds himself deep in a web of gambling and corruption surrounding the racetrack.

Cast
Jack Hedley as Jim Matthews
Jacqueline Ellis as Marion Parker
Patrick Magee as Ben Black
Richard Warner as Crabtree
Derek Francis as R. R. Harris
Austin Trevor as Colonel Warburton
Harry Locke as Burnside
Larry Martyn as Clive Parker

Howard Pays as Freddie
Hilda Barry as Mrs Sanders
George Tovey as Wally Sanders
Larry Taylor as Reilly
Harold Goodwin as Floyd
Douglas Bradley-Smith as Carter
Tenniel Evans as the doctor
Stanley Morgan as the police sergeant

References

External links
 
Never Back Losers at BFI Screenonline

1961 films
Edgar Wallace Mysteries
Films scored by Ron Goodwin
British black-and-white films
British crime films
Merton Park Studios films
1960s English-language films
British horse racing films
1961 crime films
1960s British films